Ivel may refer to:

Places
Ivel, Iran, a village in Mazandaran Province
Ivel, Kentucky, an unincorporated community
River Ivel, a river in the east of England

Other
Ivel Z3, an Apple IIe compatible computer
Ivel Ultra, an Apple II compatible computer
St Ivel, a brand of dairy products in the United Kingdom
St. Ivel International, an annual international figure skating competition in Great Britain
Ivel Agricultural Motors Limited, a British company producing tractors and other vehicles from 1902 to 1920

See also